Din is a 1992 Pakistani television series written by Amjad Islam Amjad, directed by Ayub Khawar and produced by Haider Iman Rizvi.

Synopsis 
The story revolves around Mr. Ehsan and his son Zeeshan and daughter Shaheen they want to study and help their village but the village is ruled by Feudal Lord Chaudhry Sardar Dilawar and has strict rules which everyone has to follow later Tabinda comes in his life who tries to change him.

Cast 
 Waseem Abbas as Faran
 Qavi Khan as Ehsan
 Nida Mumtaz as Shaheen
 Bindiya as Tabinda
 Mehmood Aslam as Chaudhry Sardar Dilawar
 Resham as Nawal
 Nabeel as Zeeshan
 Naima Khan as Imtenan's wife
 Sohail Ahmed as Badruddin
 Asad Tadeer as Mushtaq
 Ismat Tahira as Zahid's mother
 Javed Rizvi as Kamali
 Aneeq Naji as Qamar
 Nayyar Ejaz as Dewan
 Ziwayya as Maria
 Wajid Bukhari as Sardar
 Tauseef Khan as Imtenan
 Saleem Pasha as Mulazim
 Simra Afzal as Maheen
 Mehmood Akhtar as Akhtar
 Zahid Qureshi as Aadmi
 Afshan Bhatti as Wife
 Neelam Khalid as Wahab's Wife

Broadcast 
It has re-run several times on PTV due to its popularity the series was rebroadcast by PTV Home under the segment PTV Gold Hour.

References

External links 
 

1990s Pakistani television series
Pakistan Television Corporation original programming
Pakistani drama television series
Urdu-language television shows